Gesher HaZiv (lit. Bridge of Splendor) is a kibbutz in northern Israel. Situated in the Western Galilee on the coastal highway between Nahariya and the Lebanese border, opposite the Akhziv National Park, it falls under the jurisdiction of Mateh Asher Regional Council.

History
Gesher HaZiv was founded on the land of the former Palestinian village of al-Zib, close to the village site.

The kibbutz was founded in 1948 by two groups: 120 people from the first immigrants' gar'in of the Habonim Labor Zionist youth movement of North America, and half of the former members of kibbutz Beit HaArava, evacuated on 20 May 1948 during the then-ongoing War of Independence. It is named in memory of the 14 Palmach members who were killed during the 1946 Night of the Bridges, and in relation to the ancient Phoenician and Arab village of Achziv whose nearby remains are part of a national park by the sea – Achziv means disappointment, so the first core of "Chalutzim" (pioneers) decided to name the new settlement, just the opposite, as "joy", in spite of the failed 1946 operation as well as their own disappointment created by the recent evacuation from Beit HaArava. The kibbutz quickly became an agricultural success after its founding.

In July 1998, Gesher HaZiv joined the vanguard of "privatization" in the kibbutz movement. Largely due to pressures caused by collective debts, the majority of the membership voted to adopt a policy of "differential income". Numerous economic branches were sold off, and many communal services were either shut down entirely or converted to a non-subsidized, pay-per-use basis. Kibbutz homes were parceled into separate lots and became the private property of each kibbutz family.

In 2004 the kibbutz began absorbing 200 families in a new housing development. The new families together with the veteran kibbutz members formed an administrative municipality which manages the community.

The veteran members retained the framework of the veteran kibbutz. In this framework they have maintained a level of mutual aid and economic cooperation, while all community services and activities are shared by all members of the new municipality. From 2006, many children of the veteran members, who had left the kibbutz in previous years, began returning with their families to build their homes in the revitalized community. They have become members of the community municipality, but also of the veteran kibbutz framework.

Education
In 1952, Gesher HaZiv became the second kibbutz to have its children sleep in the parents' homes (lina Mishpahtit) rather than in communal children's houses (lina meshutefet).

On the kibbutz grounds are two regional schools: the elementary school Hofei HaGalil ("Galilee Shores"; grades 1–6) and the experiential secondary school Sulam Tsor ("Ladder to Tyre"; grades 7–12). These schools serve local kibbutzim and moshavim, along with accepting private students from nearby towns. Since the mid-1990s, Gesher HaZiv has its own local chapter of the Zionist youth movement HaNoar HaOved VeHaLomed.

Notable people
David Coren (1917-2011), politician and pedagogue
Tomer Ginat (born 1994), basketball player

References

Further reading
Goldberg, J.J. and King, Eliot (eds.), Builders and Dreamers: Habonim Labor Zionist Youth in North America. New York: Herzl Press, 1993.

External links
Kibbutz website 

Kibbutzim
Kibbutz Movement
North American-Jewish culture in Israel
Privatized kibbutzim
Populated places established in 1949
Populated places in Northern District (Israel)
1949 establishments in Israel